USS Curlew was a Union Navy stern-wheel steamer that saw service during the American Civil War.  Built in 1862 in Pennsylvania as a civilian vessel, she was purchased by the Union Navy on December 17, 1862.  Converted into a tinclad gunboat, she saw service from 1863 to 1865, often serving on the Mississippi River, the Ohio River, and the Tennessee River.  In May 1863, she was involved in a minor action against Confederate forces on the Mississippi River off of the shore of Arkansas. July saw Curlew take part in an expedition up the Red River of the South, the Tensas River, the Black River, and the Ouachita River that captured two steamers and destroyed two more and a sawmill.  On May 24, 1864, she dueled with Pratt's Texas Battery while on the Mississippi River, and on November 4 of that same year, was near the action of the Battle of Johnsonville but was unable to join the fighting.  Decommissioned on June 5, 1865, she was sold in mid-August and her further career is unknown.

Construction and characteristics 
In 1862, the stern-wheel steamer Florence was constructed at either Pittsburgh, Pennsylvania or Elizabeth, Pennsylvania. On December 17, she was purchased by the Union Navy for military service in the American Civil War, at a cost of $21,500 while the vessel was at Cincinnati, Ohio. She was converted into a gunboat and renamed Curlew, after a type of bird. Curlew was commissioned on February 16, 1863, with acting Master G. Hentig in command. She was initially armed with eight 24-pounder howitzers, but according to naval historian Paul Silverstone, was instead armed with six 32-pounders and one rifled 20-pounder at a later point during her service history. Curlew became a tinclad, a variant of the ironclad warship with only light metal armor, and was assigned the identification number 12, to be painted on her pilothouse.

Service history 

On February 17, 1863, Curlew left Cairo, Illinois, to join the fleet of Admiral David Dixon Porter.  She served on patrol duty on the Mississippi River, and in May was reported to be serving on the White River, where she captured four Confederate soldiers.  On May 29, Curlew was reported to be under the command of acting Ensign R. A. Turner, as Hentig had been arrested earlier that month. On June 2, she took part in a minor action against Confederate forces on the shore of Arkansas in a Union Army-Navy joint expedition, raiding what was believed to be the position of Confederate troops that had earlier fired on a Union transport.  Over the course of a little over a week in mid-July, she was part of a multi-vessel expedition led by Lieutenant Commander Thomas O. Selfridge Jr. that moved into the Red River of the South, Black River, Tensas River, and Ouachita River.  The Union ships captured two steamers (one in a tributary of the Black River and the other in the Tensas), destroyed two others, and also destroyed a sawmill, a quantity of lumber, and Confederate supplies.  Turner was killed by a provost marshal in August and was replaced by acting Ensign H. B. O'Neill.

From December 23 through January 14, 1864, Curlew saw service on the Ohio River and the Tennessee River, before going to Mound City, Illinois, to be repaired.  Leaving Mound City on March 12, she took members of the United States Coast Survey to Grand Gulf, Mississippi.  On May 24, Curlew was engaged in an action with Pratt's Texas Battery on the Mississippi River off the coast of Arkansas.  The Confederate artillerymen and the Union gunboat dueled for about 20 to 35 minutes, with Curlew taking several hits and firing 28 shots.  Curlew signaled with her ship's whistle for the nearby timberclad USS Tyler to come to her aid, but the Confederate artillery left before Tyler arrived.  No sailors on Curlew were injured during the fighting.

On May 31, Curlew returned to Mound City before again going on the Mississippi on June 30.  Patrolling between Natchez, Mississippi, and Vicksburg, Mississippi, she sometimes skirmished with Confederate land forces.  She then moved upriver on October 24 to again serve on the Ohio and the Tennessee.  On November 4, Curlew was part of a group of six steamers that came to the aid of the gunboats USS Key West, USS Tawah, and USS Elfin who were heavily engaged with Confederate artillery on shore during the Battle of Johnsonville.  The narrowness of the Tennessee River at that location and Confederate shore fire prevented Curlew and the other five would-be relief ships from rescuing Key West, Tawah, and Elfin, and the latter three were destroyed.  From February 1865 to mid-June of that year, Curlew was tasked with making surveys of the river near Cairo and Mound City.  A military return dated March 1 indicated that Curlew was assigned to the Ninth District of the Mississippi River Squadron, was armed with eight cannons, and was commanded by acting Master M. Hickey, while another dated April 1 listed her as being assigned to special duty, still under the command of Hickey. She was decommissioned on July 5 and sold at an auction on August 17 for $7,600. Her further career is unknown.

References

Sources
 
 
 
 
 
 
 
 
 
 

Steamships of the United States Navy
Ships built in Pennsylvania
Ships of the Union Navy
Gunboats of the United States Navy
American Civil War patrol vessels of the United States
1862 ships